Summerscope is a Canadian current affairs television series which aired on CBC Television in 1980.

Premise
This series consisted of reports and discussion on topics such as Canadian federalism and the Constitution, the restoration and maintenance of old buildings, the presence of Nazi war criminals in Canada, the McDonald Royal Commission of Inquiry into Certain Activities of the RCMP and the Canada Bank Act.

Scheduling
This half-hour series was broadcast Thursdays at 10:00 p.m. from 5 June to 11 September 1980.

References

External links
 

CBC Television original programming
1980 Canadian television series debuts
1980 Canadian television series endings
1980s Canadian television news shows